The 2000 Hawaii Warriors football team represented the University of Hawaii at Manoa as a member of the Western Athletic Conference (WAC) during the 2000 NCAA Division I-A football season. Led by second-year head coach June Jones, the Warriors compiled an overall record of 3–9 with a mark of 2–6 in conference play, placing in a three-way tie for sixth place in the WAC.

Schedule

References

Hawaii
Hawaii Rainbow Warriors football seasons
Hawaii Warriors football